12th Army Corps was an army corps in the French Army. Commanded by Général Lebrun in the Franco-Prussian War then by General Galliffet from 1882 to 1886.

World War I
On the outbreak of the First World War it was subordinated to Fourth Army.

It became part of the Tenth Army and was deployed in Italy from November 1917. It was later in action at the Second Battle of the Piave River and the Battle of Vittorio Veneto.

Its commanders in World War I were : 
 18 August 1913 : Pierre Auguste Roques
 5 January 1915 : 
 12 May 1916 : Charles Nollet
 25 October 1916 : Pierre Jean Charles Antoine Nourrisson
 29 March 1918 : Jean César Graziani, also commander of all French forces in Italy.

See also
Achille Pierre Deffontaines

Notes

012
Corps of France in World War I
Italian front (World War I)
Military articles needing translation from French Wikipedia
Military units and formations of the Franco-Prussian War